Pantheon International plc is a large British publicly traded private equity fund of funds investment trust. Established in 1987, the company was the first private equity fund-of-funds investment trust and is a constituent of the FTSE 250 Index. It is managed by Pantheon Ventures.The trust is chaired by Sir Laurie Magnus.

References

External links

Financial services companies established in 1987
Investment trusts of the United Kingdom